George–Little Rock Senior High School is a rural public high school in George, Iowa. It is a part of the George–Little Rock Community School District, which formed on July 1, 2003, by the merger of the George and Little Rock school districts. The school serves both George and Little Rock. The building houses the district headquarters.

George and Little Rock began sharing sports in 1987.

Athletics
The Mustangs are members of the Siouxland Conference, and participate in the following sports:
Football
 2006 Class 2A state champions
Cross country
 Boys' 2017 Class 2A state champions (as Central Lyon-George-Little)
Volleyball
Basketball
Boys' 2006 Class 1A state champions
Wrestling
Golf
Track and field
 Boys' 2019 Class 1A state champions
Baseball
Softball

See also
List of high schools in Iowa

References

External links
 George–Little Rock Community School District

Public high schools in Iowa
Schools in Lyon County, Iowa